Corme-Écluse is a commune in the Charente-Maritime department in southwestern France.

The village is noteworthy for its Romanesque church of the eleventh century, with a single nave and transepts with ogival vaulting. The massive crossing tower is supported on a vaulted cupola on pendentives. The richly sculptural west front, with a porch of three bays and an arcade above, was restored about 1860.

Population

See also
 Communes of the Charente-Maritime department

References

External links
 

Communes of Charente-Maritime